1985 in the Philippines details events of note that happened in the Philippines in that year.

Incumbents

 President: Ferdinand Marcos (KBL)
 Prime Minister: Cesar Virata (KBL)
House Speaker: Nicanor Yñiguez
 Chief Justice: 
 Enrique Fernando (until July 24)
 Felix Makasiar (July 24 – November 20)
 Ramon Aquino (starting November 20)

Events

June
 June 12 – The Central Bank issues the New Design Series, starting with a new 5-peso banknote with the face of Emilio Aguinaldo.

August
 August 13 – Fifty-six assemblymen of the Regular Batasang Pambansa sign a resolution calling for the impeachment of President Ferdinand Marcos for graft and corruption, culpable violation of the Constitution, gross violation of his oath of office and other high crimes.

September
 September 20 – The Escalante massacre is an incident in Escalante, Negros Occidental where paramilitary forces of the government gun down civilians engaged in a protest-rally in commemoration of the 13th anniversary of the declaration of Martial Law. At least 20 die and 30 more are injured.

October
 October 18 – Typhoon Saling made landfall in the Philippines. The typhoon leaves 101 dead and $68 million in damage (1985 dollars).

November
 November  3 – President Marcos announces in a television interview he would set snap elections.

December
 December 2 – The Sandiganbayan acquits all the accused including General Fabian Ver in the Assassination of Benigno Aquino Jr.
 December 9 – The Philippine Daily Inquirer is founded by Eugenia Apostol, Max Soliven and Betty Go-Belmonte, as the broadsheet releases its first issue.

Holidays

As per Act No. 2711 section 29, issued on March 10, 1917, any legal holiday of fixed date falls on Sunday, the next succeeding day shall be observed as legal holiday. Sundays are also considered legal religious holidays. Bonifacio Day was added through Philippine Legislature Act No. 2946. It was signed by then-Governor General Francis Burton Harrison in 1921. On October 28, 1931, the Act No. 3827 was approved declaring the last Sunday of August as National Heroes Day. As per Republic Act No. 3022, April 9th was proclaimed as Bataan Day. Independence Day was changed from July 4 (Philippine Republic Day) to June 12 (Philippine Independence Day) on August 4, 1964.

 January 1 – New Year's Day
 February 22 – Legal Holiday
 April 5 – Maundy Thursday
 April 6 – Good Friday
 April 9 – Bataan Day
 May 1 – Labor Day
 June 12 – Independence Day 
 July 4 – Philippine Republic Day
 August 13  – Legal Holiday
 August 25 – National Heroes Day
 September 21 – Thanksgiving Day
 November 30 – Bonifacio Day
 December 25 – Christmas Day
 December 30 – Rizal Day

Business and economy
November 8 – SM City North EDSA is opened as the first SM Supermall in the Philippines.

Entertainment and culture

Births
 January 14 – Jason Abalos, television actor
 January 16 – Stefano Mori, actor and musician
 January 20 – Roxanne Barcelo, Filipino-American singer and actress
 January 31 – Ronnie Liang, singer
 February 9 – Gabe Norwood, basketball player
 February 11 –  Chris Lutz, basketball player
 February 14 – Heart Evangelista, Chinese-Filipino singer, actress and TV show host
 February 17 – Anne Curtis, actress, singer, model and TV show host
 February 24 – Aicelle Santos, singer-songwriter
 March 8 – Michael Burtscher, basketball player
 March 18 – Bianca King, Filipina-German model and actress
 April 7 – KC Concepcion, singer and actress; currently the Philippines Goodwill Ambassador against hunger of the UN's World Food Programme
 April 14 – Mac Baracael, basketball player
 April 15 – Diana Zubiri, actress
 April 16 – JC Tiuseco, Chinese Filipino actor, basketball player, TV show host and model
 April 23 – Angel Locsin, actress and commercial model
 May 8 – Jayvee Uy, politician
 June 1 – L.A. Lopez, singer and preacher
 June 6 – Victor Basa, actor
 June 16 – Francis Allera, basketball player
 June 20 – Camille Prats, actress
 June 23 – Laarni Lozada, singer
 June 25 – Ehra Madrigal, actress
 July 7 – Pong Escobal, basketball 
 July 12 – Marco Alcaraz, actor
 July 15 – Chris Tiu, professional basketball player, TV show host and commercial model
 July 20 – Solenn Heussaff, actress, model, and host
 August 15 – Cogie Domingo, actor
 September 1 – Camile Velasco, Filipino American singer-songwriter
 September 3 – Carlo Aquino, actor and musician
 September 5 – John Medina, actor
 September 7 – Neri Naig, actress
 September 8 – Renz Fernandez, actor
 September 9 – Ketchup Eusebio, actor
 September 20 – Marcial D. Brigado, Top Global; M2 Turret Operator
 September 27 – Alex Castro, actor and model
 October 7 – Jason Ballesteros, basketball player
 October 8:
 Bruno Mars, Filipino American singer-songwriter and record producer 
 Rox Santos, songwriter
 October 13 – Jimbo Aquino, basketball player
 October 19 – RR Enriquez, model, television host and actress
 November 5 – Patricia Fernandez, actress
 November 17 – Bea Saw, actress
 November 23 – Elmer Espiritu, basketball player
 December 5 – Dionne Monsanto, actress
 December 11 – Lovely Abella, dancer and comedian

Deaths
 January 2 – Gabriel "Flash" Elorde, Filipino boxer (b. 1935)
 January 14 – Teodoro Agoncillo, Filipino historian and author (b. 1912)
 March 7 – Victorio C. Edades, Filipino painter (b. 1895)
 April 18 – Arturo Tanco, Jr., former minister of Agriculture (b. 1934)
 May 6 – Julie Vega, Filipina child actress and singer (b. 1968)
 May 31 – Pepsi Paloma, teenage star (b. 1966)
 August 11 – Manuel Conde, actor, director, and producer (b. 1915)
 December 15 – Carlos P. Romulo, Filipino diplomat, politician, soldier, journalist, and author (b. 1898)

Date unknown
 Conching Rosal, Filipina opera singer (b. 1926)

References